Joy Junction is a 501(c)(3) faith-based homeless shelter and church ministry that offers emergency and short-term essentials such as food, clothing, counseling, transportation, and shelter to homeless women, children, and families throughout Albuquerque, New Mexico. Joy Junction's guests can also receive other services for their spiritual and emotional needs. Joy Junction's mantra is "giving the homeless a Hand Up, not a handout, to help them get back on their feet." Joy Junction opened in 1986 and has become the largest homeless shelter in New Mexico.

Founder 
Joy Junction was founded by Dr. Jeremy Reynalds in 1986. Dr. Jeremy Reynalds was born in England and immigrated to the United States in 1978, where he himself was homeless for a time. Dr. Reynalds now holds a doctorate in intercultural education at Biola University in La Mirada, California. His autobiography is titled From Destitute to Ph.D.: My Homeless Journey.

Mission 
Joy Junction’s mission is to provide for the basic physical needs, as well as the spiritual needs, of the homeless in Albuquerque. The ministry strives to help adults return to society as active, functional members able to assist others in similar situations. Guests at Joy Junction may stay as long as necessary, including a stay in Joy Junction’s long-term transitional housing.

On average, Joy Junction serves as many as 300 people per day, including as many as 60 to 80 children; over 16,000 meals are provided to the homeless in Albuquerque every month, and 200,000 every year. Men, women, children, and families in need are accepted at Joy Junction regardless of their race, national origin, sexual orientation, sex, age, color, or religion.

Funding 
Joy Junction relies on the donations from individuals and corporations throughout New Mexico. Because Joy Junction is a nonprofit, donations-only charitable organization, the ministry receives no federal, state, or local funding. The entire program is funded by the generous donations of individuals, businesses, and churches in and around Albuquerque.
Donations and gifts accepted at Joy Junction include:
 Monetary gifts
 Volunteered time and talent
 Clothing, food, cars, household items, hygiene products, linens, furniture

External links 
 Joy Junction Website at JoyJunction.org

References 

Welfare and service organizations
Community organizations
1986 establishments in New Mexico